Government College for Men, Nazimabad is an all-male degree college located in Karachi, Pakistan, adjacent to the flyover located in Nazimabad town.

Departments 

The college has the following departments:

 Botany 
 Chemistry
 Computer Science
 English
 Islamic Studies
 Mathematics
 Physical Education and Sports
 Physics
 Statistics
 Urdu
 Zoology
 Business Math
 Accounting 
 Principle of Commerce 
 Geography 
 Statistics

Admission 

The college offers the in Pre-and Pre-for the Board of Intermediate , Karachi (B.I.E.K)under CAP (Centralized Admission Policy). For undergraduate level, the college offers a combination of from any three of the following subjects (Mathematics, Physics, Chemistry, logy, Statistics, biology, chemistry, Botany & Zoology)

History 
The college was established in 1953 under the name of Central Government College for Men to provide higher education to the newly settled and prominent area of Nazimabad in Karachi.  The college was taken over by the Government of Sindh in 1961, and since then named as Government College for Men Nazimabad, Karachi.

Principals of Government College for Men Nazimabad, Karachi.

 Dr. Athar Rasheed
 Prof. Abdul Mateen
 Dr. S. Safdar Hussain
 Dr. S. M. H. Jafri
 Dr. S. M. Ahmed
 Dr. M. A. Rauf
 Prof. Rashid Ahmed Khan
 Dr. A. Salam
 Prof. N. A. Farooqi
 Prof. A. R. A. Samo
 Prof. Zahir Ahmed
 Prof. Abdul Latif
 Prof. Kamaluddin
 Prof. M. A. Hai Moosa
 Prof. Syed Kamaluddin
 Prof. Jamal Ashraf Ansari
 Prof. Abdul Wahab Khan
 Prof. Mazharul Haq
 Prof. S. Khurshid Haider Zaidi
 Prof. Muhammad Zarrar Khan
 Prof. Naveed Ahmed Hashmi
 Prof. Ismail Jawaid
 Prof. Naveed Ahmed Hashmi

Library 

Library of  Government College for Men Nazimabad, Karachi is a two-story building, the upper story of which serves place for calm and busy researchers. The lower story is working as reading hall for the students. Presently, the library has more than 25000 books on different subjects. The leading dailies of the country are available in the Reading Hall.

Government College for Men, Nazimabad was established in 1953 under the name of Central Government College for Men to provide higher education to the newly settled and prominent area of Nazimabad in Karachi. The college was taken over by the Government of Sindh in 1961 and since then named as Government College for Men, Nazimabad

The college library is situated in front of the main entrance of the college building. Today, the college library has a collection of over 18,500 reference books, encyclopedias, dictionaries, manuals, atlases, computer etc.

Notable alumni 

 Sarfaraz Ahmed (Pakistani wicket-keeper batsman)

References 

Men's universities and colleges
Universities and colleges in Karachi
1953 establishments in Pakistan